Stabbing the Drama is the sixth studio album by Swedish melodic death metal band Soilwork. The record was released on February 28, 2005, via Nuclear Blast label.

For a time this was the last to feature long-time guitarist Peter Wichers, who left the band after the subsequent tour until rejoining in 2008.

Style-wise, this could be considered a more diverse album than the previous record, Figure Number Five, taking elements of the past and present, and potential future. Most of the songwriting is done by guitarist Peter Wichers, and the central musical theme contains a simpler sound than heard on prior albums, with a reduction of harmonic guitar leads and a more metalcore-centric approach, such as usage of stop-start rhythm guitar work and breakdowns. This is also the first album to feature new drummer Dirk Verbeuren, who brings a more technical approach to the band's drumming compared to the previous two albums.

Some pressings of the CD have the times for tracks three and four reversed, with parts of track three still at the start of track four. Various pressings of the CD also mislabeled the final track, "If Possible", to the 12th Bonus Track "Wherever Thorns May Grow" which is only featured on the US and European limited digipak edition, respective the Japanese and Korean pressings. 1,000 copies were made in a limited collectors metal case in the shape of the Soilworker's logo.

Threat Signal did a cover version of the song "Stabbing the Drama" along with Speed, Live.

Some copies of Stabbing the Drama were mastered using HDCD. Although it is unmarked, playing the album in a CD player able to decode HDCD will give superior sound quality.

Track listing

Charts

Personnel
'''Soilwork
 Björn "Speed" Strid − vocals
 Peter Wichers − lead guitar
 Ola Frenning − rhythm guitar
 Ola Flink − bass
 Sven Karlsson − keyboards
 Dirk Verbeuren − drums

References

Soilwork albums
2005 albums
Nuclear Blast albums